Cotiujenii Mici is a commune in Sîngerei District, Moldova. It is composed of three villages: Alexeuca, Cotiujenii Mici and Gura-Oituz.

References

Communes of Sîngerei District